Heaven Hai Yu-fen (born May 19, 1977), also known as Hai Fen, is a Taiwanese host, actress, entrepreneur and television producer. She had her debut as a host for TVBS-G, on Entertainment News, and has appeared in several television series and films since 2009. In 2016, she was nominated for the Golden Bell Award for Best Newcomer in a Television Series for War Family.

Personal life 
In 2021, Hai developed "Lu Lu Gu Lu" (嚕嚕姑滷), a line of braised food products, and created the concept art for the product line.

In November 2022, Hai gave birth to a daughter, nicknamed "Nian Nian" (念念).

Filmography

Television series

Film

Variety and reality show

Music video appearances

Theater

Discography

EPs

Published works

Awards and nominations

References

External links 

 
 
 
 

1977 births
Living people
Taiwanese television presenters
Taiwanese television actresses
Taiwanese television personalities
Taiwanese women radio presenters
21st-century Taiwanese actresses
Fu Jen Catholic University alumni
Taiwanese film actresses
Taiwanese stage actresses